Rosalie Loveling (20 March 1834 – 4 May 1875) was a Flemish author of poetry, novels, and essays.

Biography

Rosalie Loveling was born in Nevele, Belgium, and was the older sister of Virginie Loveling, also an author, with whom she co-wrote part of her oeuvre. After the death of their father Herman Loveling, the family moved to Ghent where the sisters moved in circles of French-speaking, mainly anti-clerical intelligentsia before eventually returning to Nevele.

She made her literary debut influenced by Klaus Groth, whose 'Trinia' she translated into Dutch. Together with her sister, she went on to write realistic and descriptive poetry with a romantic undertone. They also published two collections of essays on life in the rural communities as well as the city bourgeoisie.

Rosalie Loveling died on 4 May 1875 in Nevele.

Bibliography

Co-authored with Virginie Loveling

 Gedichten (1870)
 Novellen (1874) Rosalie :  ; Virginie: 
  (1876) Rosalie:  ; Virginie: 
  (1883) Virginie:  ; Rosalie: 
  (1950)
  (compilation and commentary by A. Van Elslander, 1978)

Sole author

  (1853)
 Trinia, translated from Klaus Groth's work (1864)
  (1866)
  (1863)
  (1868)

See also
 Flemish literature

References

External links
 Flemish writers 

1834 births
1875 deaths
Flemish writers
Belgian women poets
Translators to Dutch
19th-century translators
19th-century Belgian women writers
19th-century Belgian writers
19th-century Belgian novelists
Belgian women novelists
19th-century Belgian poets
Belgian essayists
19th-century essayists